The Agrarian Party of Russia (APR; Agrarnaya Partiya Rossii, Аграрная Партия России, АПР) was an agrarian political party in Russia. Founded in February 1993, it was among the earliest parties in the Russian Federation.

History

The Agrarian Party of Russia was founded on 26 February 1993, by the head of the Altai Republic, Mikhail Lapshin and Vasily Starodubtsev, governor of the Tula region and former member of the Soviet Union's State Committee on the State of Emergency. During their leadership (1993–2004), the party made an alliance with the Communist Party of the Russian Federation (CPRF) and the Fatherland – All Russia bloc. Until 2008, the party supported agrarian socialism and collectivism.

Founder Mikhail Lapshin led the party until 2004; its most recent leader was Vladimir Plotnikov. In the legislative elections in December 1993, the Agrarian Party obtained 37 seats in the Duma and won 8% of the popular vote. Between 1994 and 1996, one of its party members, Ivan Rybkin, was the speaker of the Russian Parliament. In the legislative elections in December 1995, the APR did not make it over the 5% threshold, obtaining only 3.78% of the votes. In the legislative elections on 7 December 2003, the party won 3.6% of the popular vote and three out of 450 seats in the parliament.

Agrarian Party member Nikolay Kharitonov ran as a presidential candidate from the Communist Party of the Russian Federation in the 2004 Russian presidential election and won 13.7% of the votes, coming out second to Vladimir Putin.
 
In the 1990s, party deputies were usually allies of the Communist Party in the State Duma and advocated for greater government support for the agricultural sector.

The party won 2.30% of the votes in the 2007 elections, did not break the 7% barrier, and thus, had no seats in the Duma.

The Agrarian Party supported the candidacy of Dmitry Medvedev in the 2008 Russian presidential election. It later merged with United Russia—the party that currently holds the most seats in the Duma.

Refounding 
The year 2012 marked an especially notable period for the party as it was officially restored, and the registered leader Olga Bashmachnikova was elected Executive Director of the Agricultural Association on May 18. This led the party to take a new direction, moving away from the ideologies of agrarian socialism and collectivism towards centrism. The party has abandoned the Alliance with the Communist Party of the Russian Federation (CPRF), which was in the union since its foundation. The APR is currently united with the People's Front for Russia and the Russian Ecological Party "The Greens".

According to the results of the elections of 2012, 2013 and 2014, the party failed to win in regional and city parliaments.

On October 21, 2019, the Supreme Court of Russia, following a lawsuit by the Ministry of Justice, liquidated the party for insufficient participation in the elections for 7 years.

Electoral results

Presidential elections

Legislative elections

References

External links
Official web site web.archive
Official website of the Agricultural Association

See also
Agrarian Party of Ukraine
Belarusian Agrarian Party

1993 establishments in Russia
2008 disestablishments in Russia
2012 establishments in Russia
2019 disestablishments in Russia
Defunct agrarian political parties
Centrist parties in Russia
Defunct socialist parties in Russia
Political parties established in 1993
Political parties disestablished in 2008
Political parties established in 2012
Political parties disestablished in 2019